Excoecaria goudotiana is a species of flowering plant in the family Euphorbiaceae. It was originally described as Stillingia goudotiana Baill. in 1861. It is native to Madagascar.

References

goudotiana
Plants described in 1861
Endemic flora of Madagascar
Taxa named by Henri Ernest Baillon
Taxa named by Johannes Müller Argoviensis